Arhopala thamyras is a butterfly in the family Lycaenidae. It was described by Carl Linnaeus in 1758. It is  found  in the Australasian realm.

Subspecies
A. t. thamyras (Buru, Ambon, Serang)
A. t. phryxus Boisduval, 1832 (Waigeu - Solomons)
A. t. minnetta (Butler, 1882) (Bismarck Archipelago)
A. t. anthore (Hewitson, 1862) (Obi, Bachan, Halmahera, Ternate)
A. t. anthelius (Staudinger, 1888) (Kai, Aru, Misool)

References

External links
 Arhopala at Markku Savela's Lepidoptera and Some Other Life Forms

Arhopala
Butterflies described in 1758
Taxa named by Carl Linnaeus
Butterflies of Oceania